Star Wars  is a 1993 arcade game developed by Sega and based on the original Star Wars trilogy. Combining elements of A New Hope and Return of the Jedi, the game has players pilot a Rebel starship and battle against the forces of the Empire. Sega developed Star Wars for their Model 1 system, the same arcade hardware that powered Virtua Fighter and Virtua Racing. Like those two titles, the graphics in Star Wars are rendered entirely using polygons. The game was given a home port under the name Star Wars Arcade, as an exclusive for the Sega 32X's launch in 1994.

Sega followed up the release of Star Wars Arcade with Star Wars Trilogy Arcade and Star Wars: Racer Arcade, as well as a Star Wars pinball game.

Gameplay

The gameplay is similar to that of Atari's 1983 Star Wars arcade game. Players pilot an X-wing or a Y-wing in first- or third-person perspective and battle Imperial forces.

The game has three levels which include intercepting TIE fighters in an asteroid field, destroying a Super Star Destroyer, and making an assault run on a Death Star. The arcade cabinet allows two people to play, with one serving as pilot and the other as gunner.

Reception

In Japan, Game Machine listed Star Wars Arcade in its June 15, 1994 issue as the sixth most-successful upright/cockpit arcade unit of the month.

Electronic Gaming Monthly described it as a decent but disappointing launch game for the 32X. They praised the excellent graphics but complained about repetitive gameplay and limited movement. GamePro similarly assessed that the game is a decent demonstration of the 32X's graphical capabilities but suffers from repetitive gameplay. They also criticized that the controls are convoluted when using a standard three-button gamepad and that in cooperative mode the second player's cursor is difficult to see against certain backgrounds. Next Generation called the 32X version "An excellent translation of a good game, and a good hint of what to expect from 32X." Flux magazine reviewed the 32X version and praised the graphics, the digitized sound bytes although they criticized the "tough" controls.  They recommend the game for Star Wars fans.

References

External links

1993 video games
1994 video games
Action video games
Arcade video games
Sega 32X games
Sega arcade games
Sega video games
Star Wars (film) video games
Star Wars arcade games
Video games developed in Japan